Steven Peterman is an American television producer, screenwriter, and actor. His credits include Benson, Square Pegs, Family Ties, Murphy Brown, Suddenly Susan, Becker, the second season of W.I.T.C.H.  and Hannah Montana.

He is an Emmy winner in the category of Primetime Emmy Award for Outstanding Writing for a Comedy Series for the Murphy Brown episode "Jingle Hell, Jingle Hell, Jingle All the Way".

Filmography

References

External links

Year of birth missing (living people)
Living people
Primetime Emmy Award winners
Circle in the Square Theatre School alumni
Place of birth missing (living people)
American male television actors
20th-century American male actors
Harvard College alumni